Subramanyam Bharti Award (Devanagari: सुब्रह्मण्यम भारती पुरस्कार) is a literary honour in India which Kendriya Hindi Sansthan, (Central Hindi Organization), Ministry of Human Resource Development, annually confers on writers of outstanding works in Hindi literature. It is also a Hindi Sevi Samman and is given to number of Hindi experts for playing their important role in promoting the Hindi language.

History
The award was established by Kendriya Hindi Sansthan in 1989 on the name of the great Tamil writer Subramania Bharati. It was first awarded in the year 1989 to Dr. Prabhakar Machwe, Dr. Wrajeshhwar Verma, Dr. Hardev Bahri, Dr. N.A. Nagappa, Prof. Ram Singh Tomar, Dr. Bhakt Darshan, Dr. P. Gopal Sharma and Sri Mangalnath Singh.

Honour
Subramanyam Bharti Award is awarded for the significant services in development of creative/critical areas in Hindi every year by the President of India.

Award Recipients
{|class="wikitable"
|- 
! Year
! Name  
! Presenter  
|-
| 1989
| Dr. Prabhakar MachweDr. Wrajeshhwar VermaDr. Hardev BahriDr. N.A NagappaPro. Ram Singh TomarDr. Bhakt DarshanDr. P Gopal SharmaSri Mangalnath Singh
|
|-
| 1990
| Acharya Devendra Nath SharmaDr. Ramanath Sahay
|
|-
| 1991
| Dr. Shivmangal Singh 'Suman'Smt. ShivaniDr. N. V. Rajagapolan
|
|-
| 1992
| Sri Vinay Mohan SharmaBaba Nagarjuna
| 
|-
| 1993
| Sri Nazir BanarasiSri Rameshwar Shukla 'Achal'''
| 
|-
| 1994
| Dr. Kailash Chandra BhatiaDr. Amba Shankar Nagar|
|-
| 1995
| Pro. Kalyanmal LodhaSri Hanumchchhastri Ayachit| 
|-
| 1996
| Sri Nageshwar SundaramPro. G Sundar Reddy|
|-
| 1997
| Dr. Nazir MuhammadDr. Laxminarayan Dubey| 
|-
| 1998
| Dr. Ram Vilas SharmaLate Dr. Vijayendra Snatak| 
|-
| 1999
| Sri Arvind KumarDr. Maheep Singh| 
|-
| 2000
| Smt. Tara PandeyDr. Kumar Vimal| 
|-
| 2001
| Sri Govind MishraSri Krishna Ballabh DwivediDr. Kanahaiya Singh
| 
|-
| 2002
| Sri Manu SharmaSri Dharampal Maini| 
|-
| 2003
| Sri Manager PandeySri Vishnuchandra Sharma| 
|-
| 2004
| Sri Vijendra Narayan SinghSri Hrituraj| 
|-
| 2005
| Sri Manzoor AhteshamSri Krishnadutt Paliwal|
|-
| 2006
| Pro. Kamla PrasadSri Surajpal Chauhan| 
|-
| 2007
| Pro. Nirmala JainPro. Nandkishore Nawal|
|}

External links
 Subramanyam Bharti Award''

Indian literary awards
Awards established in 1989
Indian literature